The DB Class V 169 consisted of a single example: V 169 001, derived from the DB Class V 160 family, with an additional gas turbine booster engine. It can be considered the prototype for diesel locomotives with a gas turbine as an additional drive; specifically the DB Class 210. Post 1968 the class designation was changed to Class 219, and the locomotive renumbered 219 001

In 1999 the locomotive was heavily renovated for a private company, and does not now have the gas turbine.

Post the merger of the Deutsche Bundesbahn and Deutsche Reichsbahn another locomotive - the DR Class 119 has been assigned to the DB class 219.

Background

From 1963 onwards the DB Class V 160 had been delivered and deployed in large numbers, and was proving successful. Thus plans were made for testing of further units were made - specifically a variant with electric train heating. These units would require more power than the engines installed in the V 160 could deliver. Three prototype units of the DB Class V 162 (later Class 217) were ordered; with the addition of a smaller supplementary diesel engine, providing via a generator the electricity for electric train supply. (see Head end power)

Another variant was the V 169, this locomotive utilised a supplementary gas turbine to improve overall performance. A General Electric LM 100-PA 104 turbine was chosen, using diesel as a fuel rather than kerosene. The locomotive turbine was built under license by Klöckner-Humboldt-Deutz (KHD) at the Oberursel plant. (see Motorenfabrik Oberursel (now part of Rolls-Royce)

KHD also received the order for manufacture of the locomotive itself, this was done at the KHD-Werk in Cologne and the locomotive delivered on the 4 June 1965 as V 169 001, it then was exhibited to the public at the International Transport Exhibition in Munich. The electric train heating was not yet ready, and so the locomotive did not enter service until January 1966.

From March 1966 the locomotive went onto the Allgäu Munich to Lindau line for testing, being stationed at Kempten.

In the V 169, the electrical generator for the heating was powered by a shaft from the gearbox of the hydraulic transmission system. This method proved successful and was later used in the DB Class 210 and DB Class 218 locomotives. The fundamental usefulness of the additional gas turbine propulsion was also demonstrated and led to the introduction of the DB Class 210 (with a more powerful turbine: an AVCO Lycoming T53-L 13).

Service history

The delivery of the Class 210s being to Kempten in 1971 for work in the Allgaeu region meant that the less powerful V 219 001 was outdated. Thus, when the gas turbine failed with damage to the combustion chamber in 1974, the locomotive was converted for other uses.

With these modifications, the locomotive was no longer suitable for passenger work, and began work as a freight locomotive around Gelsenkirchen often working across the Dutch border, up to 25 November 1977. In 1978, the locomotive was decommissioned and then left in the open in Bremen until 1985.

In 1985 the locomotive was sold to company of Elizabeth Layritz GmbH in Penzberg, a firm specialising in the modernisation of scrapped locomotives. Subsequently, the locomotive was sold to Impresa Attilio Rossi in Italy and worked between Rome and Naples (as T1591) up till 1998/9.

Reconstruction and operation by German private railways

After the German railway reform of 1994 cheap second-hand locomotives with authorization for work in Germany were in demand. So in 1999 the locomotive was bought (back to Germany) by leasing firm RailImpex and sent to Gmeinder for refurbishment and remotorising,.

The refurbishment included the replacement of the original Maybach engine with a Caterpillar diesel engine, a review of its condition and the installation of new wiring.

The railway company Waldhof AG (Bahngesellschaft Waldhof AG or 'BGW') (Now called Rhenus Rail Logistics GmbH) in Mannheim bought the locomotive for freight work and designated it as DH 280 01. It was painted in the green-gray color scheme of the BGW. 

In the summer of 2000, the loco was used for garbage trains from Krefeld to Hildesheim until September when a collision meant the machine must return to Gmeinder for repair. By February 2001 it was back in operation. After that, among other workings it pulled Lime trains for BASF from Ludwigshafen to Stromberg.

In October 2001 the unit was transferred to Eisenbahnen und Verkehrsbetriebe Elbe-Weser GmbH and worked on container trains between Hamburg, Bremerhaven and Bremen. The EVB designation is 420 01The locomotive suffered a serious accident with frame damage in 2013 and has not been in service since then. 420 01 had been parked in the Bremervörde depot since August 2015.

In August 2021 the V169 was bought by a locomotive engineer that founded his own company LOKRAPID (LR) in Oldenburg. In 2022 he restored the locomotive and repainted it in its original DB livery with respectively one of her former official numbers V 169 001 and 219 001-5''' on the fronts. It went back in service on 20 September 2022 under the UIC number "92 80 1219 001-5 D-LR" operating various trains.

See also
DB Class V 160 family Overview of this and related locomotives
DB Class 210 Related successor locomotives also with auxiliary gas turbines
DR Class 119 An East German diesel locomotive (reclassified after reunification as DB Class 219)

References

Additional sources
219 Lieferliste (supply list of DB Class V219) Chronological list of operators of V 169 001. privat-bahn.deUnterschiede in der V160-Familie (differences between V 160 family of locomotives) Brief description of V 169 class. deutsche-lokomotiven.deAllgemeine Infos - Baureihe 210/219 (General Info. Class 210/219 Very brief information. v160.deExternal links

railimpex Johannes Scheurich GmbH 
Die Mittenwaldbahn, Layritz - Penzberg, Firma Elisabeth Layritz GmbH Details of company: Elisabeth Layritz GmbH from mittenwaldbahn.de''

Diesel locomotives of Germany
V 169
Private locomotives of Germany
Deutz locomotives
B-B locomotives
Railway locomotives introduced in 1965
Gas turbine locomotives of Germany
Diesel-hydraulic locomotives of Germany
Standard gauge locomotives of Germany